Blah, Blah, Blah is the debut studio album by American Brooklyn-based hip hop duo Blahzay Blahzay. It was released on August 13, 1996, on Fader/Mercury/PolyGram Records. Recording sessions took place at D&D Studios and at Firehouse Studio in New York. Production was handled by the group itself.

Track listing

Sample credits
Track 3 contains a sample from "I Wanna Do Something Freaky to You" by Leon Haywood
Track 4 embodies portions of "The Warning" by Notorious B.I.G.
Track 6 contains elements from "Mad Izm" by Channel Live
Track 9 contains elements from "Sound of da Police" by KRS-One
Track 12 contains a sample of "Latoya" by Just-Ice
Track 13 contains excerpts from "Get It Together", elements from "Show & Prove" by Big Daddy Kane, samples from "Rockin' Chair" by Gwen McCrae, and embodies portions of "Come Clean" by Jeru the Damaja

Personnel
Martell "MC Outloud" Ellis – lyrics, vocals, producer, mixing, arranger, executive producer (tracks: 1-12)
Felix "P.F. Cuttin'" Rovera – scratches, producer, mixing, arranger, executive producer (tracks: 1-12)
Joe Quinde – mixing (tracks: 1, 2, 5, 6, 9, 12, 13), recording (tracks: 1, 10, 12)
Kieran Walsh – mixing (tracks: 1, 4, 7, 10, 11)
Suydam – assistant recording (track 2)
Donovan McCoy – recording & engineering (track 3)
Nolan 'Dr. No' Moffitte – recording (tracks: 4, 5, 6, 7, 8, 9, 10, 11), engineering (track 8)
Max Vargas – assistant mixing (tracks: 4-7, 9-13)
Bill Donely – recording (track 13)
Chris Gehringer – mastering
Domingo Padilla – executive producer (track 13)
Bruce Carbone – A&R
Calvin Laburn – A&R
Kenyatta Bell – A&R
Leanne Drum – A&R
Daniel Hastings – art direction, photography
Miguel Rivera – design
Eric Weissman – legal
Micheline Levine – legal

Charts

References

External links

1996 debut albums
Mercury Records albums
East Coast hip hop albums